Waimate County was one of the counties of New Zealand on the South Island.

See also 
 List of former territorial authorities in New Zealand § Counties

Counties of New Zealand
Politics of Canterbury, New Zealand
Waimate